The VLF Transmitter Cutler is the United States Navy's very low frequency (VLF) shore radio station at Cutler, Maine. The station provides one-way communication to submarines of the Navy's Atlantic Fleet, both on the surface and submerged. It transmits with call sign NAA, at a frequency of 24 kHz and input power of up to 1.8 megawatts, and is one of the most powerful radio transmitters in the world.

Establishment at Cutler, Maine 
The current Cutler Naval Station was built during 1960 and became operational on January 4, 1961. It has a transmission power of 2 megawatts. As with all VLF stations, the transmitter has a very small bandwidth, and so cannot transmit audio (speech) but only coded text messages, at a relatively low data rate. The transmission consists of a continuously encrypted minimum-shift keying (MSK) signal capable of multi channel operations. The transmitter uses the frequency 24.0 kHz. During the past it used 17.8 kHz. The callsign of the station is  NAA.

Antenna 

The extensive antenna system consists of two separate identical umbrella antenna arrays, designated the “north array” and the “south array”. Each array consists of a ring of 13 tall metal masts connected at the top by a network of horizontal cables. The cables form six diamond-shaped "panels" radiating from the central tower in a hexagonal pattern shaped like a snowflake. The two arrays normally operate together as one antenna, but each is designed to function independently to allow maintenance on the other array. The central tower of each antenna system is 304 m (997.4 ft) tall. It is surrounded by six 266.7 m (875 ft) tall masts, placed on a ring with a radius of 556 m around the central tower. The remaining six towers of the array are 243.5 m (799 ft) tall, placed on a circle of 935.7 m (3070 ft) around the central tower.

Each element (“panel”) of the antenna is suspended between the central tower, two towers of the inner ring and one tower of the outer ring. The entire array is 6140 ft (1.871 km or 1.16 miles) in diameter.

This type of antenna array is termed a trideco or umbrella antenna, a type of antenna which can radiate power efficiently at the low 24 kHz frequency used. It functions as a capacitively top-loaded electrically short monopole antenna. Vertical wires at the central mast of the antenna radiate the VLF radio waves, while the suspended horizontal cable array functions as a large capacitor, increasing the efficiency of the vertical radiators. At the base of each mast is a star-shaped network of cables suspended a few feet above the ground, extending out hundreds of feet, termed a counterpoise, which serves as the bottom plate of the "capacitor".

The climate in Maine results in severe icing of the antenna wires during the winter, resulting in unacceptably large loads on the supporting structures. Therefore, the antennas have a deicing system which runs large 60 Hz electric currents through the wires, heating them, to melt the ice. The power required for deicing is 3 MW, higher than the transmitter output power. An antenna array cannot transmit while it is being deiced, and one reason for having two arrays was to allow one array to be deiced while the other provides crucial uninterrupted transmission capability. Repairs and adjustments to an array can also be made without interrupting transmission.

Antenna maintenance 
Antenna maintenance is performed during the summer months. During maintenance periods the station transmits using one array while work is performed on the other array, which is grounded. This allows continuous transmission, crucial since the Navy closed Annapolis (NSS), the only other East Coast VLF station.

The region where the two arrays come close together, near the transmitter house, is called the "bow-tie area". There are two panels and three towers from each array in this area. The fields on the grounded array are highest in the bow-tie area due to proximity to the active array. The present station operating procedure, based on a past RADHAZ survey, does not allow work on the bow-tie area towers or panels while transmitting either array. There is an ongoing tower painting project at Cutler scheduled for completion during the next few years. By the present station policy, completion of this project would require several months of total downtime.

Test transmissions have been arranged, during which only four panels of one array are connected to the transmitter. The objective of the four-panel tests was to allow painting and normal maintenance on the bow-tie area towers of the array which is entirely inactive. A secondary objective of the tests is to characterize the antenna operating parameters which had not been measured since changing to 24.0 kHz.

See also 
 Jim Creek Naval Radio Station
 Naval Communication Station Harold E. Holt
 Lualualei VLF transmitter
 Aguada transmission station
 List of masts

References

Further reading 

 
 A Lockportian Goes "Down East" In Maine (includes photos of NAA towers)
 
 http://cryptome.org/eyeball/cutler/cutler-eyeball.htm
 http://www.lockport-ny.com/QCWA/activities.htm

 

Communications and electronic installations of the United States Navy
Military installations in Maine
Military radio systems of the United States
Buildings and structures in Washington County, Maine

Military equipment introduced in the 1960s